Lake View Cemetery is a historic cemetery located at Penn Yan in Yates County, New York. It is a  cemetery property that includes wooded and open acres included in the cemetery's historic landscape plan and developed in two phases between about 1855 and 1906.  The property includes the Abraham Wagener Memorial Chapel, a two-story brick Gothic Revival structure built in 1923–1924. It was listed on the National Register of Historic Places in 1996.

Notable burials
 Morris Brown, Jr. (1842–1864), Civil War Medal of Honor Recipient
 Samuel S. Ellsworth (1790–1863), New York's 26th District in the United States House of Representatives from 1845 to 1847
 Brigadier General Ralph Wilson Hoyt (1849–1920), commander of the Department of the Lakes
 Edward Johnston (1844–1920), Indian Wars Medal of Honor Recipient
 Joshua Lee (1783–1841), New York's 27th District in the United States House of Representatives from 1835 to 1837
 Daniel Morris (1812–1889), Civil War US Congressman
 Edwin C. Nutt (1868–1933), farmer and politician
 Andrew Oliver (1815–1889), US Congressman
 Brevet Major General John Morrison Oliver (1828–1872), Civil War general
 William Morrison Oliver (1792–1863), New York's 27th District in the United States House of Representatives from 1841 to 1843
 Elijah Spencer (1775–1852), US Congressman from 1821–1823
 Hanford Struble (1842–1903), lawyer, politician, and judge

Gallery

References

External links

 Lake View Cemetery at Political Graveyard
 

Cemeteries on the National Register of Historic Places in New York (state)
Cemeteries in Yates County, New York
National Register of Historic Places in Yates County, New York